"Ya Ya" is a song by Lee Dorsey. The song was written by Dorsey, C. L. Blast, Bobby Robinson, and Morris Levy.  Levy's participation in the writing has been called into question; the Flashback release of the single lists only Dorsey and Blast as writers, as do the liner notes to the American Graffiti soundtrack.

Background
The song was inspired by a children's nursery rhyme, and includes session guitar player Jimmy Spruill on it.

Chart performance
The song reached number seven on the Billboard Hot 100 and number one on the R&B singles chart in 1961.

Cover versions

Beatles connection
According to author Mark Lewisohn in The Complete Beatles Chronicles (p. 365), the Beatles regularly performed "Ya Ya", live from 1961 to 1962 in Hamburg, Liverpool and elsewhere. John Lennon was always the lead vocalist on this number but no recorded version is known to exist.

However, Tony Sheridan, the Beatles' close associate, recorded a live version of the song for Polydor Records which was released in October 1962 on the A-side of a German extended play. This 45RPM is credited to Tony Sheridan & "The Beat Brothers" who are often wrongly believed to be the Beatles. But the fledgling British group had no involvement in recording this track although "Sweet Georgia Brown", included on this disc, is indeed recorded by them.

Track listing for Ya Ya by Tony Sheridan & The Beat Brothers 
7" EP Polydor – 21 485 (1962, Germany.)
 A1. / A2. "Ya Ya Part 1 & 2"
 B1. "Sweet Georgia Brown"
 B2. "Skinny Minny" (sic)

In 1964, "Ya Ya" (Part 1) was included as filler on the German compilation album "The Beatles' First!" and the complete recording can be heard on The Early Tapes of the Beatles, the 1984 CD reissue of this album.

In 1974, John Lennon included a snippet of the song on the album Walls and Bridges with himself on vocals and piano, credited as "Dad", and his 11 year old son Julian on the snare drum. Lennon covered the song fully on his 1975 album Rock 'n' Roll.

Other covers 

In 1966, Tommy James and the Shondells released a version as the B-side to their song "It's Only Love"
Mouse and the Traps recorded "Ya Ya" as the B-side of their 1967 single "Cryin' Inside".
The Hombres included a cover on their only album Let It Out (Let It All Hang Out), in 1968.
Trio recorded and released it on their 1981 eponymous first album and their live album Live im Frühjahr 82.
Lee Michaels covered the song on his 1971 album 5th.
Ike & Tina Turner covered the song in the early 1970s but their version was not released until 2004 on the album His Woman, Her Man: The Ike Turner Diaries.
Steve Miller covered the song on his 1988 album Born 2 B Blue.

Johnny Hallyday (French version) 

French singer Johnny Hallyday covered the song in French. His version, titled "Ya ya twist", reached No. 1 in Wallonia (the French speaking part of  Belgium) in 1962.

Track listing 
7" EP Philips 432.739 BE (1962, France etc.)
 A1. "Retiens la nuit" (2:54)
 A2. "Sam'di soir" (3:00)
 B1. "Ya ya twist" (2:27)
 B2. "La faute au twist" (1:50)

Charts

Other French language covers 
 Petula Clark recorded the song (released in February 1962, #1) almost simultaneously to Hallyday's version.
 Malika et les Golden Stars released it on a Philips record in January 1963.
 Sylvie Vartan recorded a cover for her album Nouvelle Vague in 2007
 In 1964, Joel Denis covered the song in Québec as "Yaya", which was rerecorded in 1994 by Mitsou.

Covers in other languages 

In 1962, Dalida covered the song in German under the title "Ya Ya Twist".
In 1980 a Norwegian retrorock band Vazelina Bilopphøggers released the song as "Gi meg fri i kveld".
Toni Montano covered it on his first album "Tonny Montano" as "Svi se sada njišu i ubrzano dišu" in 1985
Goran Bregović covered the song as "Ringe ringe raja" in his soundtrack for the 1995 film Underground.

Notes

References

1961 songs
1961 singles
1962 singles
Songs written by Morris Levy
Johnny Hallyday songs
Trini Lopez songs
Petula Clark songs
Tommy James and the Shondells songs
Lee Michaels songs
John Lennon songs
Lee Dorsey songs
Ike & Tina Turner songs
American rhythm and blues songs
Philips Records singles
Fury Records singles
Polydor Records EPs